Y Soft Corporation is a multinational software and electronic hardware company founded in 2000, which operates in 21 countries. The company's headquarters are in Brno, Czech Republic, with other offices in France, Hungary, Denmark, Israel, United Kingdom, United Arab Emirates, United States, Japan, Singapore, Australia, and China.

Y Soft Ventures, the company's in-house venture arm, was established in 2014 as a way for the two co-founders to assist other Central European entrepreneurs looking to start their own companies with business and financial support.

Products

The company's core products are:  

 The YSoft SAFEQ platform, which manages on-premises and hybrid 2D and 3D printing and document capture, including pull printing, paper copying, faxing, scan workflows, cloud printing, and other tasks.
 YSoft EveryonePrint native cloud platform, which enables cloud printing capabilities such as pull printing and location-aware printing in private, public, or hybrid infrastructures.

History
Y Soft was co-founded in 2000 by Václav Muchna, CEO and chairman of the board, and Martin de Martini, now chief information officer and board member, as part of a student project with Masaryk University in Brno, Czech Republic. Muchna left university and started Y Soft a month after his 20th birthday.

Y Soft's first expansion was the opening of an office in Hungary. In 2008, Y Soft acquired XpertImage, resulting in the establishment of Y Soft North America in Grapevine, Texas, and new offices in Japan and Israel.
  
In 2012, Y Soft filed and received a US patent for a "System for scalable processing of files in the cloud". The following year, the company expanded into Australia with the acquisition of Equitrac Systems, and also established an office in Dubai.
 
In 2014, Y Soft created an in-house venture capital fund, Y Soft Ventures, to invest in Central European startups. 
 

In late 2014 Y Soft invested a stake in, and later fully acquired, the Czech 3D printer company BE3D. Soon after, YSoft SAFEQ was integrated with the be3D printers to create a new product, YSoft BE3D eDee, a 3D printer integrated with YSoft SAFEQ providing print management, workflow and an accounting system. In 2015, Y Soft started offering print management and document capture as software as a service (SaaS) by subscription.

In 2016 the company established YSoft Labs, an internal innovation center focusing on artificial intelligence, robotics, business processes and future developments in 3D printing. In July 2016 the YSoft SAFEQ version 6 was introduced as a platform.

In Autumn 2016 YSoft released its Global Operational Excellence (GOE) Framework, a set of processes and tools that facilitates deployment of YSoft SAFEQ for large international customers.

In 2016, Y Soft joined the Mopria Alliance. In 2017 YSoft SAFEQ became the de facto Mopria certified enterprise print server for printing from Android mobile apps. The company also opened offices in the UK.

In 2016, Y Soft released Clerbo, an application serving as a document management system and a process tool. The product evolved into an employee lifecycle tool and Learning Experience Platform (LXP) for pre- and onboarding, learning and development, and offboarding. 
 
In 2017 Y Soft opened an office in China and moved its manufacturing facility to larger premises.

In 2019 Y Soft launched BE3D Academy, part of its YSoft BE3D eDee 3D printing education platform, containing resources related to 3D printing for use by teachers.

Since 2020, Y Soft has been on the board of the United States Chamber of Commerce in the Czech Republic. A representative of the company was a board member between 2020 and 2022 and vice president from 2022. 

In 2022, Y Soft launched AIVA, a product branch designed for automated testing and device interaction for embedded systems, mobile apps, and devices, using robotic technology, computer vision, and machine learning to give evaluate product quality and user experience.

In 2022, Y Soft acquired the Danish cloud print company EveryonePrint, procuring a new office in Copenhagen. Using software acquired from EveryonePrint, Y Soft launched two subscription-based cloud print services, Y Soft EveryonePrint and SAFEQ Managed. Following the acquisition, former EveryonePrint CEO Tavs Dalaa became the new Chief Technology Officer of Y Soft.

Awards
 In 2006, Václav Muchna received the "Emerging Entrepreneur of the Year" award from Ernst & Young.
 In 2011, Muchna received the "Technology Entrepreneur of the Year for 2010" award for the Czech Republic and "Entrepreneur of the Year" for the South Moravian Region.  
 In 2014, Y Soft won the CzechInvest "Investor of the Year" award in IT & Share Services for 2013.
 In 2016, Muchna received the "Difference Maker" award from ENX magazine.
 In 2017, Y Soft was named in the European Business Awards' "Ones to Watch" Innovation category.
 In 2018, Vaclav Muchna received the Centennial Award from the U.S. Embassy in the Czech Republic.
 In 2019, YSoft SafeQ 6 was chosen by Buyers Lab (BLI) as 2020 Outstanding Enterprise Print & Workflow Management Platform.
 In 2019, Vaclav Muchna, for a second time, was named an ENX Difference Maker in Office Technology.
 In 2020, YSoft SAFEQ 6 was named "Outstanding Enterprise Print & Workflow Management Platform" by Buyer’s Lab (BLI).
 In 2021, Y Soft's EveryonePrint was named "Cloud Print Management Solution of the Year" at the Print IT Awards.
 In 2022, Y Soft received the "Best Innovation Award" from MPSA.

References

Further reading
 Rivero, Victor. Practical in Prosek -- A Czech School’s Story of Engaging Students in the Hands-on World of 3D Printing EdtechDigest. 17 March 2017.

Companies based in Brno
Software companies established in 2000
Multinational companies
Software companies of the Czech Republic
Czech brands
3D printer companies
Czech companies established in 2000